Simon "Si" Spurrier (born 2 May 1981) is a British comics writer and novelist, who has previously worked as a cook, a bookseller, and an art director for the BBC.

Getting his start in comics with the British small press, he went on to write his own series for 2000 AD, like Lobster Random, Bec & Kawl, The Simping Detective and Harry Kipling, as well as a number of stories for the flagship character Judge Dredd. In recent years he has broken into the American comic book industry, writing mainly for Marvel Comics. He also wrote Marvel's X-Force in 2014 and 2015, which starred the characters Cable, Psylocke, Marrow and Fantomex.

He started co-writing Star Wars: Doctor Aphra from Marvel Comics with Kieron Gillen in November 2017 on issues #14-19, taking over with issue #20 in May 2018.

Simon has also written a number of novels, initially on other people's properties, but in 2006 he signed a two-book contract with Hodder Headline, the first of which was Contract (2007) and the second A Serpent Uncoiled (2011).

Career
Simon Spurrier writes mainly for the British comic 2000 AD but has also written comic-strips for the anthology Warhammer Monthly, as well as contributing written articles,  stories and reviews to the Judge Dredd Megazine. He is the creator of Lobster Random (with Carl Critchlow), The Simping Detective (with Frazer Irving), From Grace (also with Irving), Zancudo (a belated follow-up to Ant Wars) with Cam Kennedy and Bec & Kawl (with Steve Roberts).

Spurrier has done a number of work for hire books, writing one 2000 AD themed novel for Black Flame press, and three science fiction novels for the Black Library, as well as an upcoming book for Abaddon Books. In May 2006 he signed a two-book contract with Hodder Headline.  The first novel, a "post-pulp" occult-crime-comedy, is titled Contract.  A limited edition hardback was released in May 2007, and the mass-market paperback is published on 4 October 2007.

He has created Gutsville with Frazer Irving and Silver Surfer: In Thy Name.

His other projects include more work for Marvel like Ghost Rider Annual #2, the one-shot "Wolverine: Dangerous Game," Danny Ketch: Ghost Rider mini-series with Javier Saltares, "Conqueror" a newuniversal one-shot, Punisher War Journal Annual #1, and X-Men Legacy vol.2, starring the character Legion. He also wrote a short story for Dark Horse Presents called "In Fetu."

Bibliography

Comics
Mega-City One:
 "The Burning Red" (with PJ Holden, in Zarjaz vol. 1 #1, 2001)
 "Catching the Rads" (with Darren Chandler, in Zarjaz vol. 1 #1, 2001)
 Tharg's Future Shocks:
 "Old Red" (with Staz Johnson, in 2000 AD #1232, 2001)
 "Given to Fly" (with Cam Smith, in 2000 AD #1257, 2001)
 "Alpha Team" (with PJ Holden, in 2000 AD #1262)
 "Sex Machine" (with Boo Cook, in 2000 AD #1264)
 "Spare Parts" (with Richard Elson, in 2000 AD #1267)
 "Hormones" (with Nigel Raynor, in 2000 AD #1279, 2002)
 "Celestial Bodies" (with Shaun Bryan, in 2000 AD #1294, 2002)
 "Tadfraggers" (with Gary Crutchley, in 2000 AD #1369, 2003)
 "Hacked" (with Jon Davis-Hunt, in 2000 AD #1754, 2011)
 Tharg's Terror Tales: "Snacks of Doom" (with Neil Edwards, in 2000 AD #1282, 2002)
 Bec & Kawl (with Steve Roberts):
 "and the Mystical Mentalist Menace!" (in 2000 AD #1290–1291, 2002)
 "Beccy Miller's Diary" (in 2000 AD #1292–1293, 2002)
 "Enlightenment" (in 2000 AD #1327, 2003)
 "eeevil.com" (in 2000 AD #1328–1330, 2003)
 "Pest Control" (in 2000 AD #1351–1354, 2003)
 "Toothache" (in 2000 AD #1383–1386, 2004)
 "Hell To Pay" (in 2000 AD #1401–1404, 2004)
 "Attack of the Cones" (in 2000 AD #1437–1440, 2005)
 "Freakshow" (in 2000 AD #1477–1481, 2006)
The Scrap (with Richard Elson, in 2000 AD #1308–1312, 2002)
Past Imperfect:
 "Red Man Rising" (with Ian Richardson, in 2000 AD #1314, 2002)
 "Warts 'n all" (with David Roach, in 2000 AD #1317, 2002)
Lobster Random (with Carl Critchlow):
 "No Gain, No Pain" (in 2000 AD #1342–1349, 2003 )
 "Tooth and Claw" (in 2000 AD #1411–1419, 2004)
 "The Agony & The Ecstasy" (in 2000 AD #1482–1490, 2006)
 "The Forget-Me-Knot" (in 2000 AD #1601-1610, 2008)
From Grace (with Frazer Irving, in 2000 AD #1357–1361, 2003)
 "Work Experience" (with Steve Roberts, in 2000 AD #1403–1407, 2003)
PlagueBringer (with Frazer Irving, in Warhammer Monthly, #84–85, 2004)
The Simping Detective (with Frazer Irving):
 "Crystal Blue" (in Judge Dredd Megazine #221–223, 2004)
 "Innocence: A Broad" (in Judge Dredd Megazine #224–226, 2004)
 "Dorks of War" (in Judge Dredd Megazine #227, 2004)
 "Playing Futsie" (in Judge Dredd Megazine #234–236, 2005)
 "Fifteen" (in Judge Dredd Megazine #237, 2005)
 "Petty Crimes" (in Judge Dredd Megazine #238–239, 2005)
 "Jokers to the Right" (in 2000 AD #1804–1811, 2012)
 "Trifecta" (in 2000 AD #1812, 2012)
The Dark Judges: "Judge Fear's Big Day Out" (text story, with an illustration by Cam Smith, in Judge Dredd Megazine #224, 2004)
Zancudo (with Cam Kennedy, in Judge Dredd Megazine #231–233, 2005)
 Daemonifuge: Heretic Saint (with co-writers: Gordon Rennie and Jim Campbell, Art: Kev Walker, Karl Richardson, Chris Quilliams and Tim Trevellion; Black Library, 2005 )
Judge Dredd:
 "Cursed Earth Rules" (with John Ridgway, in Judge Dredd Megazine #236, 2005)
 "In the Stomm" (with Boo Cook, in Judge Dredd Megazine #236, 2005)
 "Dominoes" (with pencils by Lawrence Campbell and inks by Kris Justice, in 2000 AD #1482, 2006)
 "Splashdown" (with pencils by Laurence Campbell and inks by Kris Justice, in Judge Dredd Megazine #245, 2006)
 "Neoweirdies" (with Paul Marshall, in 2000 AD #1496–1498, 2006)
 "Versus" (with Peter Doherty, in 2000 AD #1499, 2006)
 "Gutshot" (with Anthony Williams/Rob Taylor, in 2000 AD #1708, October 2010)
 "The Beast in the Bay" (with Patrick Goddard, in 2000 AD #1709, November 2010)
Harry Kipling (with Boo Cook):
 "Prologue" (in 2000 AD #1476, 2006)
 "Mad Gods & Englishmen" (in 2000 AD #1481–1483, 2006)
 "Whetting the Whistle" (in 2000AD #1492–1493, 2006)
 "Something for Nothing" (in 2000AD #1497–1499, 2006)
 "The Hitman and Hermoth" (in 2000AD #1509-ongoing, 2006)
Beneath (with Frazer Irving, in The Telegraph Magazine 2006-02)
London Falling (with Lee Garbett, in 2000 AD #1491–1495, 2006)
Tales From the Black Museum: "Ruddler's Cuddlers" (with Graham Manley, in Judge Dredd Megazine #246, 2006)
Chiaroscuro (with Smudge, in 2000 AD #1507–1517, 2006)
The Angel Gang: "Before they wuz dead" (with Steve Roberts, in Judge Dredd Megazine #258-262, 2007)
Gutsville (with Frazer Irving, Image, 2007, ongoing)
Silver Surfer: In Thy Name (with Tan Eng Huat, 4-issue mini-series, Marvel Comics, November 2007)
Ghost Rider:
Ghost Rider Annual #2 (with Mark Robinson, Marvel Comics, 2008)
Danny Ketch: Ghost Rider (with Javier Saltares, 5-issue mini-series, Marvel Comics, 2008)
The Vort (as G. Powell, with D'Israeli, in 2000 AD #1589–1596, 2008)
 "Wolverine: Dangerous Game" (with Ben Oliver, one-shot, Marvel Comics, June 2008}
 newuniversal: "Conqueror" (with Eric Nguyen, one-shot, Marvel Comics, October 2008)
 Punisher War Journal Annual #1 (with Werther Dell’Edera, Marvel Comics, November 2008)
 "The One Who Got Away" (with Paul Davidson, in Dark X-Men: The Beginning #3, Marvel Comics, October 2009)
 "The Ghost of Asteroid M" (with Leonard Kirk, in Nation X #1, February 2010)
 "In Fetu" (with Christopher Mitten, in Dark Horse Presents, Dark Horse Comics, 2010)
 X-Men: Blind Science (with Paul Davidson/Francis Portela, one-shot, Marvel Comics, July 2010)
 X-Men: Curse of the Mutants – Smoke and Blood (with Gabriel Hernandez Walta, one-shot, Marvel Comics, November 2010)
 X-Men Legacy vol. 2 (with Tan Eng Huat #1–24, Marvel Comics, 2012–2014)
 Extermination (with Jeffrey Edwards and V Ken Marion, 8 issue TPB, Boom studios, 2013)
 Six-Gun Gorilla (with Jeff Stokely, 6 issue TPB, Boom studios, 2013)
 X-Men Legacy #300 (co-written with Mike Carey and Christos Gage, drawn by Tan Eng Huat, Steve Kurth and Rafa Sandoval, Marvel Comics, March 2014)
 X-Force vol.4 (with Rock-He Kim, #1-#15, Marvel Comics, February 2014)
 The Spire (with Jeff Stokely, #1-#8, Boom Studios, July 2015)
 Godshaper (with Jonas Goonface, #1-#6, Boom Studios, 2017)
 Star Wars: Doctor Aphra #14-#19 (with Kieron Gillen, Marvel Comics, November 2017)
 Star Wars: Doctor Aphra #20-#40, Annual #2 (Marvel Comics, May 2018)
 Coda (with Matías Bergara, Boom Studios, May 2018)
 The Dreaming (with Bilquis Evely, #1-#20, DC Black Label, September 2018)
 John Constantine: Hellblazer (with Aaron Campbell, #1–12, DC Black Label, November 2019)
 Step by Bloody Step, #1-ongoing (Image Comics, February 2022)
 Damn Them All, #1-ongoing (with Charlie Adlard, Boom! Studios, October 2022)

Web comics

Novels
Spurrier has written a number of Warhammer 40,000 and 2000 AD-related novels:

Crime novels

Awards
 2002: Nominated for the "Best New Talent" National Comics Award
 2007: Nominated the "Favorite Newcomer Writer" Eagle Award
 2020: Won the GLAAD Media Award for Outstanding Comic Book

References

Bibliography
Simon Spurrier at 2000 AD online
Simon Spurrier at the Black Library

External links

British art directors
British comics writers
21st-century British novelists
Living people
Warhammer 40,000 writers
British male novelists
21st-century English male writers
1981 births